Metalurh-2 Zaporizhzhia is a Ukrainian football team based in Zaporizhzhia, Ukraine. The team has been featured regularly in the Ukrainian Second Division it serves as a junior team for the FC Metalurh Zaporizhzhia franchise. Like most tributary teams, the best players are sent up to the senior team, meanwhile developing other players for further call-ups.

League and cup history

{|class="wikitable"
|-bgcolor="#efefef"
! Season
! Div.
! Pos.
! Pl.
! W
! D
! L
! GS
! GA
! P
!Domestic Cup
!colspan=2|Europe
!Notes
|-
|align=center|1998–99
|align=center|3rd "C"
|align=center|8
|align=center|26
|align=center|11
|align=center|6
|align=center|9
|align=center|30
|align=center|33
|align=center|39
|align=center|Did not enter
|align=center|
|align=center|
|align=center|
|-
|align=center|1999–00
|align=center|3rd "B"
|align=center|12
|align=center|26
|align=center|6
|align=center|7
|align=center|13
|align=center|26
|align=center|39
|align=center|15
|align=center|1/32 finals Second League Cup
|align=center|
|align=center|
|align=center|
|-
|align=center|2000–01
|align=center|3rd "B"
|align=center|4
|align=center|28
|align=center|12
|align=center|5
|align=center|11
|align=center|51
|align=center|38
|align=center|41
|align=center|1/4 finals Second League Cup
|align=center|
|align=center|
|align=center|
|-
|align=center|2001–02
|align=center|3rd "B"
|align=center|13
|align=center|34
|align=center|11
|align=center|15
|align=center|8
|align=center|39
|align=center|40
|align=center|48
|align=center|
|align=center|
|align=center|
|align=center|
|-
|align=center|2002–03
|align=center|3rd "B"
|align=center|13
|align=center|30
|align=center|7
|align=center|8
|align=center|15
|align=center|33
|align=center|44
|align=center|29
|align=center|
|align=center|
|align=center|
|align=center|
|-
|align=center|2003–04
|align=center|3rd "C"
|align=center bgcolor=tan|3
|align=center|30
|align=center|17
|align=center|5
|align=center|8
|align=center|54
|align=center|31
|align=center|56
|align=center|
|align=center|
|align=center|
|align=center|
|-
|align=center|2004–05
|align=center|3rd "C"
|align=center|13
|align=center|28
|align=center|6
|align=center|7
|align=center|15
|align=center|27
|align=center|48
|align=center|25
|align=center|
|align=center|
|align=center|
|align=center|
|-
|align=center|2005–06
|align=center|3rd "C"
|align=center bgcolor=tan|3
|align=center|24
|align=center|13
|align=center|4
|align=center|7
|align=center|39
|align=center|24
|align=center|43
|align=center|
|align=center|
|align=center|
|align=center|
|-
|align=center|2006–07
|align=center|3rd "B"
|align=center|12
|align=center|28
|align=center|9
|align=center|3
|align=center|16
|align=center|26
|align=center|40
|align=center|30
|align=center|
|align=center|
|align=center|
|align=center|
|-
|align=center|2007–08
|align=center|3rd "B"
|align=center|17
|align=center|34
|align=center|6
|align=center|7
|align=center|21
|align=center|33
|align=center|66
|align=center|25
|align=center|
|align=center|
|align=center|
|align=center|
|-
|align=center|2008–09
|align=center|3rd "B"
|align=center|15
|align=center|34
|align=center|9
|align=center|4
|align=center|21
|align=center|35
|align=center|68
|align=center|31
|align=center|
|align=center|
|align=center|
|align=center|
|-
|align=center|2009–10
|align=center|3rd "B"
|align=center|14
|align=center|26
|align=center|3
|align=center|1
|align=center|22
|align=center|18
|align=center|66
|align=center|10
|align=center|
|align=center|
|align=center|
|align=center|
|-
|align=center|2010–11
|align=center|3rd "B"
|align=center|10
|align=center|22
|align=center|5
|align=center|4
|align=center|13
|align=center|18
|align=center|43
|align=center|19
|align=center|
|align=center|
|align=center|
|align=center|
|-
|align=center|2011–12
|align=center|3rd "B"
|align=center|12
|align=center|26
|align=center|5
|align=center|3
|align=center|18
|align=center|19
|align=center|43
|align=center|18
|align=center|
|align=center|
|align=center|
|align=center|
|}

Managers
 2013-2015 Dmytro Kolodyn

See also
FC Metalurh Zaporizhzhia

Notes and references

FC Metalurh Zaporizhzhia
1998 establishments in Ukraine
Metalurh-2 Zaporizhzhia